The Philippine bulbul (Hypsipetes philippinus) is a songbird species in the bulbul family, Pycnonotidae.

It is endemic to the Philippines. Its natural habitats are subtropical or tropical moist lowland forest and subtropical or tropical moist montane forest; on Mount Kitanglad on Mindanao, for example, it is abundant in any kind of primary forest at least between 500 and 2,250 m ASL.

Taxonomy and systematics
The Philippine bulbul was originally described in the genus Turdus and later placed in the genus Ixos. In 2010, it was re-classified to the genus Hypsipetes as it is very closely related to the type species of that genus, the black bulbul. Until 2010, the Mindoro bulbul, Visayan bulbul and Zamboanga bulbul were all considered as subspecies of the Philippine bulbul.

Subspecies 
Three subspecies are currently recognized:
 H. p. parkesi - du Pont, 1980: Found on Burias
 H. p. philippinus - (Forster, 1795): Found in northern Philippines
 H. p. saturatior - (Hartert, 1916): Found in eastern-central and southern Philippines

Behaviour and ecology
Fledglings of the Philippine bulbul were recorded on Mindanao in late April, but the breeding season seems to be prolonged as females with ripe ovarian follicles were still found in April and May. Territorial songs are heard at lower altitudes as late as May, while further upslope the birds are silent at that time of year and presumably engaged in breeding activity. The besra has been recorded as a predator of young Philippine bulbuls, and this or other goshawks might also catch adult birds.

A common and adaptable bird as long as sufficient forest remains, it is not considered a threatened species by the IUCN.

Footnotes

References
 Gregory, Steven M. (2000): Nomenclature of the Hypsipetes Bulbuls (Pycnonotidae). Forktail 16: 164–166. PDF fulltext
 Moyle, Robert G. & Marks, Ben D. (2006): Phylogenetic relationships of the bulbuls (Aves: Pycnonotidae) based on mitochondrial and nuclear DNA sequence data. Mol. Phylogenet. Evol. 40(3): 687–695.  (HTML abstract)
 Pasquet, Éric; Han, Lian-Xian; Khobkhet, Obhas & Cibois, Alice (2001): Towards a molecular systematics of the genus Criniger, and a preliminary phylogeny of the bulbuls (Aves, Passeriformes, Pycnonotidae). Zoosystema 23(4): 857–863. PDF fulltext
 Peterson, A. Townsend; Brooks, Thomas; Gamauf, Anita; Gonzalez, Juan Carlos T.; Mallari, Neil Aldrin D.; Dutson, Guy; Bush, Sarah E. & Fernandez, Renato (2008): The Avifauna of Mt. Kitanglad, Bukidnon Province, Mindanao, Philippines. Fieldiana Zool. New Series 114: 1-43. DOI:10.3158/0015-0754(2008)114[1:TAOMKB]2.0.CO;2 PDF fulltext

Philippine bulbul
Endemic birds of the Philippines
Philippine bulbul
Taxonomy articles created by Polbot